Michael Dennis Rogers (born July 16, 1958) is an American lawyer and politician serving as the U.S. representative for  since 2003. He is a member of the Republican Party of Alabama. Rogers served as the Ranking Member of the House Armed Services Committee from 2021 to 2023 and as the Ranking Member of the House Homeland Security Committee from 2019 to 2021.

Early life and education
A sixth-generation resident of Calhoun County in East Alabama, Rogers graduated from Saks High School and earned both his undergraduate degree in political science and Master's of Public Administration at Jacksonville State University.

Early political career 
At age 28, Rogers became the youngest person to join the Calhoun County Commission. In 1994, Rogers won a seat in the Alabama House of Representatives, and became minority leader in his second term.

U.S. House of Representatives

Elections
In 2002, U.S. Representative Bob Riley was elected governor of Alabama, leaving Alabama's 3rd congressional district seat open. Rogers won the Republican nomination. In the general election, he faced Democratic veteran Joe Turnham, Jr., who had served three years as state party chairman and had run against Riley for Congress in 1998. The Democratic and Republican national parties targeted the district, with Speaker Dennis Hastert promising Rogers a seat on the Armed Services Committee should he win. Rogers outspent Turnham, raising and spending $1,656,290 to Turnham's $1,015,132, and held an even greater margin in independent expenditures. Rogers defeated Turnham, 50% to 48%. In this election, he was a rare Republican endorsee of The Anniston Star.

Campaign contributions from ARMPAC
Rogers received campaign contributions from former House Majority Leader Tom DeLay's ARMPAC. DeLay was convicted of felony money laundering of campaign finances and conspiracy to launder money. As of August 2016, Rogers has not offered to return any of the $30,000 he received. Rogers said that DeLay is innocent until proven guilty, and that he would not return the money "while the judicial process runs its course".

Tenure

112th Congress (2011–2013)
In December 2011, Rogers voted in support of H.R. 10, the Regulations from the Executive in Need of Scrutiny Act, which would have required Congressional approval for any "major regulations" issued by the executive branch but, unlike the 1996 Congressional Review Act, would not require the president's signature or override of a probable presidential veto.

115th Congress (2017–2019)
In 2017, Rogers worked with Representative Jim Cooper on a proposal to establish a Space Corps under the Department of the Air Force. The proposal passed the House and failed in the Senate. A bill with very similar language was signed into law two years later to create the United States Space Force. Rogers has been a major proponent of the Space Development Agency and taking an aggressive approach to space militarization.

In August 2017, Rogers held a town hall event in Oxford, Alabama, focused on efforts to repeal to the Affordable Care Act. During the town hall, a constituent raised questions about campaign donations to Rogers and his wife Beth, a Calhoun County District Court judge. The constituent specifically asked about monetary contributions to the Rogerses from Mike Hubbard, who was convicted of ethics violations in 2016. Rogers said that Hubbard was a family friend and appeared to threaten the constituent, saying, "you keep my wife out of this and be a man or we'll take it outside". The constituent said he filed a complaint with the Oxford police department over Rogers's comments.

117th Congress (2021–2023)
Rogers was at the U.S. Capitol on January 6, 2021, when it was attacked. The next day, he tweeted, "there is no place for political violence in America" and called for law and order. Even after the attack, Rogers supported efforts to overturn the 2020 presidential election results, voting to oppose the certification. He voted against impeaching Donald Trump a second time in the wake of the attack. His rationale for his decision was that the impeachment was a partisan action by Nancy Pelosi that would "further divide our nation".

Rogers voted against the American Rescue Plan in February 2021. His rationale for opposing the bill was that it was full of "extreme socialist initiatives" and too expensive, and that it was too soon for another bill after the December 2020 Consolidated Appropriations Act. He also said the bill did not support schools reopening and that it funded abortions.

As of October 2021, Rogers had voted in line with Joe Biden's stated position 10.3% of the time.

118th Congress (2023–present)
During the 2023 Speaker of the United States House of Representatives election, Rogers suggested that committee assignments be stripped from representatives who did not vote for Kevin McCarthy. He told Politico that his comments were more than a threat, saying "I promised it". Rogers called the representatives voting against McCarthy "legislative terrorists who have no problem killing the hostage".

During the 14th ballot for Speaker, Rogers lunged at Representative Matt Gaetz after Gaetz spoke with McCarthy. Representative Richard Hudson physically restrained Rogers. The Associated Press reported that Rogers "charged" at Gaetz before Hudson pulled Rogers back by the shoulder, then the face. According to The New York Times, Gaetz was seeking a subcommittee chairmanship in the House Armed Services Committee, of which Rogers is in line to become chair. Multiple representatives criticized Rogers after the confrontation, including Marjorie Taylor Greene, who said it was "out of line" and expected consequences for Rogers, and Tim Burchett, who compared Rogers's actions to being under the influence of alcohol on the House floor, saying "people shouldn't be drinking, especially when you're a redneck, on the House floor". Burchett later retracted his comments about Rogers, saying that they were made out of frustration and that "we're all friends".

During an appearance on Fox News on January 8, 2023, Gaetz said that he had forgiven Rogers for the outburst and that he was looking forward to working with Rogers on the House Armed Services Committee. Gaetz also said he did not think Rogers should be punished for an "animated moment". Later that day, Rogers tweeted a message of reconciliation in response to Gaetz, saying that he regretted losing his temper on the House floor and that he would be happy to continue his working relationship with Gaetz.

On January 9, 2023, multiple media outlets reported that Rogers was planning to step down from the House Steering Committee in the wake of the controversy. Rogers confirmed to Politico that he was considering the decision, but said it had not yet been finalized; 1819 News reported that Rogers "may change his mind". Less than 12 hours later, Rogers said he would not resign from the committee, saying that both Republican and Democratic leaders had urged him not to. Politico called Rogers's reversal an example of the "dishevelment" in the House following McCarthy's election to the speakership.

Committees
 Committee on Armed Services (Chair)
 Subcommittee on Readiness
 Subcommittee on Strategic Forces
 Committee on Homeland Security

Caucus memberships 
 Congressional Cement Caucus
United States Congressional International Conservation Caucus
 Veterinary Medicine Caucus
 Congressional NextGen 9-1-1 Caucus
 Republican Study Committee

Political positions

In 2020, Rogers received a lifetime rating of 86% from the American Conservative Union, one of the most moderate voting records of a Southern Republican that year. He supported an amendment to declare that people retain the right to pray and to recognize their religious beliefs, heritage, and traditions on public property, including schools. He co-sponsored legislation to prohibit the physical desecration of the U.S. flag. Rogers sponsored a bill expressing Congress's continued support for equal access of military recruiters to institutions of higher education.

Abortion

Rogers is anti-abortion. As of 2020, he has a 100% rating from National Right to Life and a 0% rating from NARAL in 2018 for his abortion-related votes. He opposes banning federal health coverage if abortion is included and opposes using human embryos for stem cell research. Rogers has voted in support of efforts to restrict interstate transport of minors for abortions and allowing partial-birth abortion only if the mother's life is at risk. He also opposes human cloning and signed the No Taxpayer Funding for Abortion Act. He co-sponsored the Sanctity of Human Life Act. Rogers supported the 2022 overturning of Roe v. Wade and called it "the right decision to protect the innocent lives of unborn children."

Civil rights

As of 2019, Rogers has a 19% rating regarding civil rights-related legislature from the NAACP.

Rogers voted against the Violence Against Women Act in 2013.

Rogers believes that marriage is between a man and a woman and voted for the Marriage Protection Amendment in 2004. In 2007, he voted against the Employment Non-Discrimination Act. Rogers has a 0/100 rating from the Human Rights Campaign regarding pro-LGBTQ policies.

Crime

Rogers opposed expanding federal hate crime law to include LGBTQ hate crimes. He voted for the Second Chance Act of 2007.

Economy

Rogers is a signer of Americans for Tax Reform’s Taxpayer Protection Pledge. He voted for the Tax Cuts and Jobs Act of 2017.

Foreign affairs 
In June 2016, Rogers called for the United States withdrawal from the United Nations in the wake of Brexit. On January 3, 2017, Rogers once again called for the U.S. to withdraw from the U.N., introducing the American Sovereignty Act of 2017. The bill still needs House, Senate, and presidential approval. On January 3, 2019, Rogers submitted a similar bill, H.R.204 - American Sovereignty Restoration Act of 2019.

Rogers agrees with President Biden giving Ground Launched Small Diameter Bombs to Ukraine to increase their munitions range, but he believes the weapons should have been given to Ukraine earlier.

Juneteenth 
In June 2021, Rogers was one of 14 House Republicans to vote against establishing June 19, or Juneteenth, as a federal holiday.

Terrorism
Rogers voted for the Patriot Act.

2020 presidential election
In December 2020, Rogers was one of 126 Republican members of the House of Representatives to sign an amicus brief in support of Texas v. Pennsylvania, a lawsuit filed at the United States Supreme Court contesting the results of the 2020 presidential election. The Supreme Court declined to hear the case on the basis that Texas lacked standing under Article III of the Constitution to challenge the results of an election held by another state. Rogers is one of 147 Republican lawmakers who voted to overturn results in the 2020 presidential election.

Honors 
Rogers was made Commander of the Order of the Star of Romania on June 8, 2017.

Electoral history

Personal life
Rogers is married, with three children. He and his family reside in Saks and are members of a Baptist Church.

References

External links

 Congressman Mike Rogers official U.S. House website
 Mike Rogers official U.S House twitter
 Mike Rogers for Congress
 
 
 

|-

|-

1958 births
21st-century American politicians
Baptists from Alabama
Baptists from the United States
Birmingham School of Law alumni
County commissioners in Alabama
Jacksonville State University alumni
Living people
Republican Party members of the Alabama House of Representatives
People from Hammond, Indiana
Politicians from Anniston, Alabama
Commanders of the Order of the Star of Romania
Republican Party members of the United States House of Representatives from Alabama